Gorgi Popstefanov (born 19 July 1987) is a Macedonian road racing cyclist, who currently rides for UCI Continental team . He is the 2010 and the 2016 Macedonian National Road Race Championships winner. Popstefanov represented Macedonia twice at the UCI Road World Championships, in 2014 and 2015.

Personal life 
Born in Skopje, Popstefanov immigrated with his family from SR Macedonia to the United States at the age of 2 and has since split much of his time between the two countries. He grew up in Garfield, New Jersey, graduated from Seton Hall Preparatory School in West Orange, New Jersey in 2005 and received a B.A. in International Affairs from George Washington University's Elliott School of International Affairs in 2009, where he was a member of the varsity crew team.  As of May 2013, he completed a J.D. in international law at Seton Hall University School of Law.

Major results 
2010
 1st  Road race, National Road Championships
2016
 1st  Road race, National Road Championships
2018
 3rd Time trial, National Road Championships

References

External links 

Living people
Road racing cyclists
1987 births
Macedonian male cyclists
People from Garfield, New Jersey
Sportspeople from Skopje
Elliott School of International Affairs alumni
Seton Hall Preparatory School alumni
Seton Hall University School of Law alumni
Sportspeople from Bergen County, New Jersey